was a Japanese musician and composer. In addition to composing the well known theme song for Cutie Honey he has also composed music for multiple anime television series and films including Lone Wolf and Cub, Candy Candy, and Mobile Suit Gundam.

Tomei Tengu BGM written and performed by Takeo Watanabe was used in the soundtrack of the 2003 movie Lost in Translation fourteen years after his death. In 2008 Takeo Watanabe posthumously received an Award of Merit from the Tokyo International Anime Fair. He died at the age of 56.

Biography 
Graduated from Musashi(?) University he studied music in Paris, France.

Works

Television

Animation 

 
 
  - See The Little Mermaid
 
 
 
 
 
 
 
 
 
 
 
 
 
  (In the English version of this series as well as in adaptations based on the English version, Watanabe's score was replaced with one by Haim Saban and Shuki Levy.)

TV dramas

Historical dramas

Theatrical releases

Movies 

 (ja) Hakuja komachi (1958) Actor
 
 The Ninja: A New Beginning (1966)
 (ja) Nemuri Kyoshiro 9: Burai-Hikae masho no hada (1967)
 (ja) Waka oyabun o kese (1967)
 (ja) Waka oyabun senryū-hada (1967)
 When the Cookie Crumbles (1967)
 (ja) Bakuto retsuden (1968)
 The Daring Nun (1968)
 Lone Wolf Isazo (1968)
 Nemuri Kyoshiro 10: Onna jigoku (1968)
 Nemuri Kyoshiro 12: Akujo-gari (1969)
 Priest and the Gold Mint (1968)
 The Valiant Red Peony (1968)
 Broken Swords (1969)
 Nemuri Kyōshirō manji giri (1969)
 The Valiant Red PeonyFlower Cards Match (1969)
 Watch Out, Crimson Bat! (1969)
 Crimson Bat - Oichi: Wanted, Dead or Alive (1970)
 The Invisible Swordsman (1970)
 The Return of the Desperado (1970)
 (ja) Asobi (1971)
 Chivalrous Woman (1971)
 Duel of Swirling Flowers (1971)
 (ja) Kaihei yon-gō seito (1971)
 Fearless Avenger (1972)
 Trail of Blood (1972)
 The Cockroach (1973)
 Cockroach Cop (1973)
 Slaughter in the Snow (1973)
 (ja) Hiroshima jingi: Hitojichi dakkai sakusen (1976)
 The Shadowstar (1976) soundtrack
 Shogun's Sadism (1976)
 (ja) Piranha-gundan: Daboshatsu no ten (1977)
 あばれはっちゃく (1979)
 (ja) Miira no hanayome: Kindaichi Kōsuke sirīzu: Arashi no yoru ni ubugoe ga kikoeru (1983)
 Serendipity Stories: Friends on Pure Island (1983)
 Fugitive Samurai (1984)
 (ja) Gokumon-iwa no kubi: Kindaichi Kōsuke shirîzu (1984)
 (ja) Mori no tonto tachi (1984)
 (ja) Kōsui shinjū: Yokomizo Seishi supesharu (1987)
 (ja) Fushichō: Kindaichi Kōsuke no kessaku suiri (1988)
 Lost in Translation (2003) soundtrack

Animated Movies 

 30000 Miles Under the Sea (1971)
 Boy of the Wilderness Isamu (1973)
 
 
 Mobile Suit Gundam I (1981)
 Mobile Suit Gundam II: Soldiers of Sorrow (1981)
 Mobile Suit Gundam III: Encounters in Space (1982)
  soundtrack

Other works

See also 
 A student of Watanabe, film composer Joe Hisaishi became famous for scoring Hayao Miyazaki films.

References

External links 
株式会社 三協新社 | HOME PAGE (Sankyo Shinsha Inc.) 
Takeo Watanabe discography at SoundtrackCollector.com
渡辺岳夫ホームページ 
 
渡辺岳夫 at Anison Generation 

1933 births
1989 deaths
20th-century Japanese composers
20th-century Japanese male musicians
Anime composers
Japanese film score composers
Japanese male film score composers
Japanese television composers
Male television composers
Musicians from Tokyo